Return to Modesty: Discovering the Lost Virtue is a 1999 non-fiction debut book by Wendy Shalit.

The non-fiction book claims that the power to heal women's purported ills lies in reinstatement of sexual modesty, the resurrection of romantic ideals, and conservative manners.

References

External links
 Modestly Yours
Book discussion on A Return to Modesy with Wendy Shalit, January 30, 1999.

1999 non-fiction books
American non-fiction books
Debut books
English-language books